Hidden Bodies is a thriller novel by Caroline Kepnes, published in February 2016. It is the sequel to her 2014 novel, You. It was loosely adapted in the second season and third season of the Netflix thriller series, You.

Kepnes published the sequel, You Love Me in 2021.

Synopsis 
Joe Goldberg came to Los Angeles from New York to start over and hunt down the woman who broke his heart – Amy Adam. Joe also wants to leave behind his dark past, which includes the murder of his girlfriend, Guinevere Beck.

However, Joe's plans suddenly change when he falls in love with an aspiring actress named Love Quinn at Soho House. She doesn't know about his past and never can. The problem is, hidden bodies don't always stay that way.

Reception 
Anthony Breznican from Entertainment Weekly gave praise to the novel, stating that "as satire of a self-absorbed society, Kepnes hits the mark, cuts deep, and twists the knife".

TV adaptation 

In February 2015, it was announced that Greg Berlanti and Sera Gamble would develop a television series based on the novel at Showtime. Two years later, it was announced that the series was purchased by Lifetime and put on fast-track development. You premiered on September 9, 2018. On July 26, 2018, ahead of the series premiere, Lifetime announced that the series had been renewed for a second season. On December 3, 2018, it was confirmed that Lifetime had passed on a second season of the series, and that Netflix had picked it up. The second season, which premiered on December 26, 2019, adapted elements from Hidden Bodies.

References 

2016 American novels
American thriller novels
American novels adapted into television shows
Novels set in Los Angeles
American satirical novels
Sequel novels
Hollywood novels
Novels by Caroline Kepnes
Atria Publishing Group books